Dennis Griffin is the current interim president of the College of Western Idaho.

Prior to coming to the College of Western Idaho Griffin had worked for fifteen years at Boise State University

References

Academics from Idaho
Boise State University faculty
Living people
Year of birth missing (living people)
Place of birth missing (living people)